Anukshanam (Telugu:అనుక్షణం, English: Every second) is a 2014 Indian Telugu-language mystery thriller, and slasher film written and directed by Ram Gopal Varma, starring Vishnu Manchu and Revathi in lead roles. Ram Gopal Varma has started a new distribution system with this film by auctioning this movie through a website. Released on 13 September 2014 without an intermission, the film opened to a mixed reception, with praise for Vishnu’s performance, the script and screenplay, but criticism of the gore, bloodshed and lack of characterisation. The film had a lukewarm reception at the box-office.

Plot
Inspired by a real-life incident, the film is based on a serial killer who sends a wave of panic across Hyderabad. The story starts with the murder of a young woman. Even as the police try to investigate the case and the news is splashed all over television channels and media, more murders take place. In comes special officer, Gautam (Vishnu Manchu) who gets onto the case and tries to figure out what could have led to the murders. Meanwhile, a series of murders take place and there is furore among the public and pressure on police to trace the killer. The murderer is known to be a taxi driver and Gautam informs the media, but later due to the pressure from the Home minister (Kota Srinivasa Rao), Gautam takes his statement back. The murders continue and later Gautam advises the people not to roam outside after dark. But the serial killer continues the murders in daylight. The serial killer is traced when he tries to murder a TV reporter. The police arrive in time to arrest him, but he escapes and in the process kills two officers. Later the media is given the photo of the serial killer. The serial killer's mother is arrested and is interrogated, in the process revealing that about her son's childhood that he had killed animals in the same way as he is killing the girls. The serial killer then goes to Gautam's house and kills his wife. The serial killer is traced out when he tries to murder Sailaja (Revathi) and another girl, Gautam enters the scene and tries to murder him the same way as he had murdered the girls. But before he does that, Shailaja stops him saying that he needs mental help. In the end, the serial killer is arrested by the police and Gautham walks away.

Cast
 Vishnu Manchu as DCP Gautam, Crime Branch Special Officer
 Surya as Psychopath Killer
 Revathi as Shailaja, a Psychologist
 Kota Srinivasa Rao as Harish Reddy, Home Minister
 Brahmanandam as Shailaja's brother
 Navdeep as Ajit (in a cameo appearance)
 Tejaswi Madivada as Satya, Gautam's wife
 Madhu Shalini as Asha, TV 6 News Reporter
 Sana as Mother

References

External links

 http://www.india-daily.com/

2010s serial killer films
Indian slasher films
Films shot in Telangana
Films directed by Ram Gopal Varma
Indian serial killer films
2014 films
Films set in Hyderabad, India
2010s Telugu-language films
2014 crime thriller films
Indian crime thriller films